Arthur Lumley Davids (born Asher Lumle Davids; 28 August 1811 – 19 July 1832) was an English orientalist and linguist. He was born in Hampshire, the only child of Jewish parents Sarah Lumley and Jonki Davids.

He was sent to an Anglican school with the purpose of preparing him for an English university. From an early age he applied himself to the study of mechanics, music, and experimental philosophy. Described as a child prodigy, his intelligence was soon discovered. During his early education he once delivered a lecture on chemistry before the whole school. However, when Davids was 10 years of age his father died, and with his mother he relocated to London.

Davids committed himself to learning the oriental languages of Turkish, Hebrew, Arabic and Persian, along with the European languages of Greek, Latin, French, Italian and German. However he was particularly devoted to the Turkish language. Wishing to follow the legal profession, he entered the office of a solicitor but as a Jew, he was prevented from proceeding to the bar. This led him to become involved in the cause of the Civil Emancipation of the Jews, and he advocated his beliefs several times in the London Times. He took part in the formation of a Society for the Cultivation of Hebrew Literature, and in 1830, at one of the meetings, he presented a lecture on the Literature and Philosophy of the Jews. He was described as having principles of the "strictest probity and honour," having a mild and unassuming manner, and his "disposition candid and communicative".

Davids is best known for his work in his Grammar of the Turkish Language, published in 1832, and dedicated to Mahmud II, the Sultan of Turkey. It was the first book to cover the topic in Europe since 1709. In 1836 his mother prepared the French translation of his work. His book was used extensively in some of David Urquhart's work. 
 
Davids fell ill early in the morning of 19 July 1832, and not wanting to alarm his mother, he did not call for assistance. He died the same day, a little more than a month before his 21st birthday, and only three weeks after his book was published. The cause of death was cholera. He is buried in Bury Street, London, and therefore probably belonged to the Bevis Marks Synagogue. His mother later remarried London architect Nathaniel Handford.

References

External links

Grammar of the Turkish Language – English copy of Davids' work

1811 births
1832 deaths
English Jewish writers
English orientalists
Jews and Judaism in London